Sunday of the Holy Forefathers or Sunday of the Holy Forefathers of Jesus Christ is a holiday that is always celebrated on a Sunday and always on the second Sunday before Christmas, in the Eastern Orthodox Church and other churches using the Byzantine Rite. The beginning of the celebration is December 11th. If December 11th is to be a weekday then the holiday is postponed next Sunday. These cases can be perceived in the year 2019, December 11 was a Wednesday, therefore, the holiday was celebrated days later on Sunday, December 15.

The Sunday that is usually from December 11 to 17 is known as the Sunday of the Holy Forefathers. The ancestors of the Old Testament. Those who lived before and under Law, and those of the flesh, namely the Patriarch Abraham whom the Lord said unto “In thy seed shall all of the nations of the earth be blessed”.

Main Verses

Apolytikion in the Second Tone
"You justified the Forefathers by faith, and through them betrothed yourself, aforetime, to the Church taken from out of the Gentiles. The saints boast in glory, for from their seed, there exists a noble crop, who is she who without seed has given You birth. By their intercessions, O Christ our God, save our souls."

Kontakion in Plagal of the Second Tone
"You did not worship the graven image, O thrice-blessed ones, but armed with the immaterial Essence of God, you were glorified in a trial by fire. From the midst of unbearable flames you called on God, crying: Hasten, O compassionate One! Speedily come to our aid, for You are merciful and able to do as You will."

Hymns
The great patriarchs and matriarchs of the Old Testament, including the patriarchs Adam, Abraham, Isaac, and Jacob. The feast also commemorates the holy prophets such as Daniel, Ezekiel, and Elijah, judges, kings, and all who lives of the flesh and under the law.

Hymn of the Ancestors
The Proto-created Adam and Eve
the Righteous Abel son of Adam
the Righteous Seth son of Adam
the Righteous Enos son of Seth
the Righteous Kainan son of Enos
the Righteous Maleleel son of Cainan
the Righteous Jared son of Maleleel
the Righteous Enoch son of Jared
the Righteous Methuselah son of Enoch
the Righteous Lamech son of Methuselah
the Righteous Noah son of Lamech
the Righteous Shem son of Noah
the Righteous Japheth son of Noah
the Righteous Arphaxad son of Shem 
the Righteous Cainan son of Arphaxad
the Righteous Sala son of Cainan
the Righteous Ever son of Salah *from whom the Jews were called Jews
the Righteous Falek son of Ever
the Righteous Raghav son of Falek
the Righteous Seruch son of Raghav
the Righteous Nahor son of Seruch
the Righteous Thara son of Nahor 
the Righteous and Patriarch Abraham son of Tarra
the Patriarch Isaac son of Abraham
the Patriarch Jacob son of Isaac
the Patriarch Reuben first son of Jacob
the Patriarch Simeon second son of Jacob
the Patriarch Levi third son of Jacob from whom the Levitical tribe also sprang
the Patriarch Judas son of Jacob from whose tribe Christ is descended
the Patriarch Zebulon son of Jacob
the Patriarch Issachar son of Jacob whose clan "gardener"
the Patriarch Dan son of Jacob from whose tribe were the Judges
the Patriarch Gad son of Jacob whose tribe always robbed and was robbed
the Patriarch Asher son of Jacob whose tribe was in rich and grain-bearing lands
the Patriarch Naphtali son of Jacob whose tribe was numerous
the Patriarch Joseph son of Jacob whose race was glorious and proud
the Patriarch Benjamin son of Jacob whose tribe was at first wild and then became calm and harmless
Phares and Zara , twin sons of Judah the Patriarch
Ezrom son of Pharez
Aram son of Hezrom
Aminadab son of Aram
Nahshon son of Amminadab
Salmon son of Naason
Boaz son of Salmon
Obed son of Boaz by Ruth
Jesse son of Obed
David the king son of Jesse
Solomon the king son of David
Rehoboam the king son of Solomon
Abijah the king son of Rehoboam
Asa the king son of Abijah
Jehoshaphat the king son of Asa
Jehoram the king son of Jehoshaphat
Uziu the king son of Jehoram
Joatham the king son of Uzzi
Ahaz the king son of Joatham
Hezekiah the king son of Ahaz
Manasseh the king son of Hezekiah
Ammon the king son of Manasseh
Josiah the king son of Ammon
Jeconiah the king 's son Josiah
Shelatiel son of Jeconiah
Zerubbabel son of Salathiel who rebuilt the Jerusalem temple when it had burned
Abiud son of Zerubbabel
Eliakim son of Abiud
Azor son of Eliakim
Zadok son of Azor
Achim son of Zadok
Eliud son of Achim
Eleazar son of Eliud
Matthan son of Eleazar
Jacob son of Matthan
Joseph the Minister, son of Jacob

Other saints of Ancestors Sunday
the Righteous Melchizedek
the Righteous Job
the Prophet Moses
Hor and Aaron the Priests
the Righteous Joshua
the Prophet Samuel
the Prophet Nathan
the Prophet Daniel
the Righteous Sarah , wife of Abraham
the Righteous Rebekah wife of Isaac
the Fair Leia first wife of Jacob
the Righteous Rachel second wife of Jacob
the Fair Asineth wife of Joseph of Jacob
the Righteous Mary sister of Moses
the Fair Deborah
the Fair Ruth
the Fair Sarafthia to whom Elias was sent
the Righteous Somanitis who hosted Elisha
the Fair Judith
the Righteous Esther who redeemed Israel from death
the Righteous Anna mother of Samuel
Fair Sossana

See also
Genealogy of Jesus
Palm Sunday
Christmas
Easter

References

External Links
Sunday of the Holy Forefathers via antiochptriarchate.org
Orthodox Church of the Sunday of the Holy Forefathers via johnsanidopoulos.com

Eastern Orthodox liturgical days
Byzantine Rite
December observances
Christian Sunday observances